The 2019 Barcelona City Council election, also the 2019 Barcelona municipal election, was held on Sunday, 26 May 2019, to elect the 11th City Council of the municipality of Barcelona. All 41 seats in the City Council were up for election. The election was held simultaneously with regional elections in twelve autonomous communities and local elections all throughout Spain, as well as the 2019 European Parliament election in Spain.

The contest was won by Republican Left of Catalonia (ERC), which under the leadership of Ernest Maragall—brother of former Barcelona mayor and president of the Government of Catalonia Pasqual Maragall with the Socialists' Party of Catalonia (PSC)—came out on top in a municipal election in Barcelona for the first time in history, as a resurgent PSC drew votes away from incumbent mayor Ada Colau's Barcelona in Common (BComú). Colau was able to retain the mayorship through an BComú—PSC alliance that received the support of Barcelona for Change (BCN Canvi) councillors under Manuel Valls, the former prime minister of France, who after his failed run at the 2017 French presidential election was nominated by the liberal Citizens (Cs) to become their mayoral candidate in his city of birth. Valls's support of Colau's investiture was based on his stated intention to prevent the pro-Catalan independence camp from securing control over Catalonia's capital city.

Together for Catalonia (JxCat), the new brand of former Democratic Convergence of Catalonia (CDC) members who had openly embraced a Catalan independence ideology following the dissolution of the Convergence and Union (CiU) federation in June 2015, fell to fifth place to a record-low 10.5% of the vote under the leadership of Joaquim Forn, the former Interior minister who was at the time at preventive detention because of his involvement in the organization of the controversial 2017 Catalan independence referendum. Concurrently, support for the People's Party (PP) plummeted even further to its worst historical showing, barely passing the five percent threshold with 5.01%, whereas the Popular Unity Candidacy (CUP) was expelled from the city council altogether.

Electoral system
The City Council of Barcelona was the top-tier administrative and governing body of the municipality of Barcelona, composed of the mayor, the government council and the elected plenary assembly. Elections to the local councils in Spain were fixed for the fourth Sunday of May every four years.

Voting for the local assembly was on the basis of universal suffrage, which comprised all nationals over 18 years of age, registered and residing in the municipality of Barcelona and in full enjoyment of their political rights, as well as resident non-national European citizens and those whose country of origin allowed Spanish nationals to vote in their own elections by virtue of a treaty. Local councillors were elected using the D'Hondt method and a closed list proportional representation, with an electoral threshold of five percent of valid votes—which included blank ballots—being applied in each local council. Councillors were allocated to municipal councils based on the following scale:

The mayor was indirectly elected by the plenary assembly. A legal clause required that mayoral candidates earned the vote of an absolute majority of councillors, or else the candidate of the most-voted party in the assembly was to be automatically appointed to the post. In the event of a tie, the appointee would be determined by lot.

Council composition
The table below shows the composition of the political groups in the City Council at the time of dissolution.

Parties and candidates
The electoral law allowed for parties and federations registered in the interior ministry, coalitions and groupings of electors to present lists of candidates. Parties and federations intending to form a coalition ahead of an election were required to inform the relevant Electoral Commission within ten days of the election call, whereas groupings of electors needed to secure the signature of a determined amount of the electors registered in the municipality for which they sought election, disallowing electors from signing for more than one list of candidates. For the case of Barcelona, as its population was over 1,000,001, at least 8,000 signatures were required.

Below is a list of the main parties and electoral alliances which contested the election:

Campaign budget

According to a report from the Catalan newspaper Diari Ara, BCN Canvi–Cs candidate Manuel Valls would have received funds from a group of businessmen to prepare the campaign, that would have included a salary of €20,000 monthly for him. Valls rejected those accusations and said all funds he received for the campaign were declared.

Opinion polls
The table below lists voting intention estimates in reverse chronological order, showing the most recent first and using the dates when the survey fieldwork was done, as opposed to the date of publication. Where the fieldwork dates are unknown, the date of publication is given instead. The highest percentage figure in each polling survey is displayed with its background shaded in the leading party's colour. If a tie ensues, this is applied to the figures with the highest percentages. The "Lead" column on the right shows the percentage-point difference between the parties with the highest percentages in a poll. When available, seat projections determined by the polling organisations are displayed below (or in place of) the percentages in a smaller font; 21 seats were required for an absolute majority in the City Council of Barcelona.

Results

Aftermath

Notes

References
Opinion poll sources

Other

Barcelona
2019
2010s in Barcelona